Ainsdale is a Metropolitan Borough of Sefton ward in the Southport Parliamentary constituency that covers the localities of Ainsdale and Woodvale in the town of Southport. At the 2011 census it had a population of 12,102.

Councillors
 indicates seat up for re-election.

Election results

Elections of the 2020s

Elections of the 2010s

References

Wards of the Metropolitan Borough of Sefton
Southport